The Gublins (also known as The Gublin Legends) is a stop-motion children's television show broadcast between 1977 and 1979. It was the final animated series made by British animator Gordon Murray, the creator of Camberwick Green, Trumpton and Chigley and was shown as part of the Saturday morning children's TV show Multi-Coloured Swap Shop on BBC One. Each episode was 5 minutes long with Murray introducing each one directly to camera.

The series related various folk tales told in verse. The Gublins themselves were chimp-like creations (the word "Gublin" is a pun on the humanoid creature "goblin") that featured in a series of Tall Stories, narrated in rhyming couplets to a simple acoustic soundtrack provided by Freddie Phillips.

There were thirteen episodes filmed although only twelve are known by name. The folk tales came from a variety of traditions, including Cornish, Bohemian and Arabic sources. The first episode, Obadiah and Flo, was broadcast on 24 December 1977. The named episode titles are:
 Obadiah and Flo
 Bessie O'the Glen (or the Inversneekie Doonie)
 The Barber of Cartina
 Mr Dilley's Mermaid
 The Prince Frog
 The Magic Tree
 The Kendal Candle
 The Emperor's Willow Warbler
 The Honey-Coloured Hat
 The Dancing Princess
 Charley's Feather
 The Prudent Prince

Associated merchandise 
Three of these stories appeared in the BBC Swap Shop Books (2,3 & 4) as photostories. There were also five photostory books published separately titled "Young Gublins Picture Storybooks". They were completely new stories called:
 The Lost Drum
 The Surprise Present
 The Wishing Well 
 Grandpa's Mistake

A VHS entitled "Children's Seventies TV Favourites" featuring episodes of The Gublins was released by Contender studios in 1998.

External links 
Images of Gublins at sausagenet.com
Gublins page at Toonhound.com
Tim Worthington's Gublins article
The Trumptonshire Web
The Trumptonshire Trilogy

References 

BBC children's television shows
British stop-motion animated television series
1977 British television series debuts
1970s British animated television series
1970s British children's television series